Hajjaj (also Romanized as Ḩajjāj) is a village in Kharturan Rural District, Beyarjomand District, Shahrud County, Semnan Province, Iran. At the 2006 census, its population was 126, in 33 families.

References 

Populated places in Shahrud County